Aturangi Putere (born 14 September 1988) is a Cook Islander footballer who plays as a midfielder. He currently plays for Avatiu in the Cook Islands Round Cup, and for the Cook Islands national football team.

References

Living people
Cook Islands international footballers
Association football midfielders
Cook Island footballers
1988 births